The Lichi Formation is a palaeontological formation located in Taiwan. It also called the "Liji Badlands" or the "Moon World of Liji".

References
 

Geologic formations of Asia
Geology of Taiwan